Zbigniew Januszkiewicz (born 18 August 1962) is a Polish swimmer. He competed in the men's 200 metre backstroke at the 1980 Summer Olympics.

References

External links
 

1962 births
Living people
Polish male backstroke swimmers
Olympic swimmers of Poland
Swimmers at the 1980 Summer Olympics
Sportspeople from Bydgoszcz
Universiade medalists in swimming
Universiade bronze medalists for Poland
Medalists at the 1981 Summer Universiade
20th-century Polish people